Jungle Jim in the Forbidden Land is a 1952 American black-and-white adventure film directed by Lew Landers and written by Samuel Newman, and starring Johnny Weissmuller as the title character. This was the eighth entry in Columbia's "Jungle Jim" series. Angela Greene and Jean Willes also star.

Plot summary
Jungle Jim battles evil ivory poachers, mutant giants, stock footage, and cheap sets with the help of a pretty anthropologist and his cute chimp Tamba.

Main cast
 Johnny Weissmuller as Jungle Jim
 Angela Greene as Dr. Linda Roberts
 Jean Willes as Denise
 Lester Matthews as Comm. Kingston
 William Tannen as	'Doc' Edwards 
 George Eldredge as Fred Lewis
 William Fawcett as Old One
 John Hart as Commissioner's Secretary

External links
 
 
 

1952 films
1952 adventure films
Films directed by Lew Landers
Columbia Pictures films
Jungle Jim films
Films set in Africa
American adventure films
American black-and-white films
1950s English-language films
1950s American films